Robert Montagu, 3rd Duke of Manchester ( – 10 May 1762) was a British politician who sat in the House of Commons from 1734 until 1739 when he succeeded to the peerage as Duke of Manchester.

Early life
Montagu was the son of Charles Montagu, 1st Duke of Manchester (1662–1721/2) and the former Hon. Dodington Greville (1671/2–1720/1). His elder brother was William Montagu, 2nd Duke of Manchester (who married Lady Isabella Montagu eldest daughter of John Montagu, 2nd Duke of Montagu and Lady Mary Churchill), Lady Charlotte Montagu (who married Pattee Byng, 2nd Viscount Torrington), and Lady Doddington Montagu.

His paternal grandparents were Robert Montagu, 3rd Earl of Manchester and the former Anne Yelverton (a daughter of Sir Christopher Yelverton, 1st Baronet). His maternal grandparents were Robert Greville, 4th Baron Brooke (son of Robert Greville, 2nd Baron Brooke) and the former Anne Dodington (daughter and heiress of John Doddington of Breamore, MP for Lymington). After his grandfather's death, his grandmother remarried to Thomas Hoby.

Career
On 28 April 1719, his father, then the 4th Earl of Manchester, was created the Duke of Manchester by King George I. Upon his father's death, his elder brother succeeded as the 2nd Duke of Manchester.

Montagu was returned as a Whig MP for Huntingdonshire at the 1734 British general election. He vacated his seat when he succeeded his brother, who died without issue, to the peerage and the Manchester Duchy in 1739. From 1739 and 1762, he held the office of Lord-Lieutenant of Huntingdonshire.

From 1735 to 1737, he served as Vice-Chamberlain to the Queen Consort. He was a Lord of the Bedchamber from 1739 to 1761, and Lord Chamberlain to Queen Charlotte from 1761 until his death in 1762.

Personal life
On 3 April 1735, Montagu was married to Harriet Dunch, daughter and co-heiress of Edmund Dunch and his wife Elizabeth Godfrey, a noted beauty. She was a sister-in-law of Hugh Boscawen, 1st Viscount Falmouth and niece of John Churchill, 1st Duke of Marlborough. Together, Harriet and Robert were the parents of:

 George Montagu, 4th Duke of Manchester (1737–1788), who married Elizabeth Dashwood (1740–1832), eldest daughter of Sir James Dashwood, 2nd Baronet, in 1762.
 Lord Charles Greville Montagu (1741–1783), who married Elizabeth Bulmer, a daughter of James Bulmer, in 1765. 
 Lady Caroline Montagu (d. 1818), who married Charles Herbert, grandson of Thomas Herbert, 8th Earl of Pembroke, in 1775.
 Lady Louisa Montagu, who died unmarried.

Lord Manchester died on 10 May 1762 leaving four children.

References

1710 births
1762 deaths
Robert Montagu, 03rd Duke of Manchester
Robert
Lord-Lieutenants of Huntingdonshire
Montagu, Lord Robert